Jean Borotra and Suzanne Lenglen were the defending champions, but withdrew before their second round match against Howard Kinsey and Mary Browne.

Leslie Godfree and Kitty Godfree defeated Kinsey and Browne in the final, 6–3, 6–4 to win the mixed doubles tennis title at the 1926 Wimbledon Championships. They remain the only married couple to ever win the mixed doubles title at Wimbledon.

Draw

Finals

Top half

Section 1

Section 2

Bottom half

Section 3

Section 4

The nationality of Mrs P Wilkin is unknown.

References

External links

X=Mixed Doubles
Wimbledon Championship by year – Mixed doubles